Sabrina is the debut studio album by Italian pop singer Sabrina, released on 24 September 1987 by Ariola.

Album information 
The album includes her first four singles; in addition to "Sexy Girl", it includes Sabrina's international top 5 breakthrough, the smash hit single "Boys (Summertime Love)", which has sold more than 1.5 million copies to date worldwide, and "Hot Girl", which made the top 10 in five European countries.

Track listing 
"Boys (Summertime Love)" (Matteo Bonsanto, Roberto Rossi, Claudio Cecchetto, Malcolm Carlton) – 4:00
"Hot Girl" (M. Bonsanto, C. Cecchetto, R. Rossi) – 3:38
"Get Ready (Holiday Rock)" (M. Bonsanto, R. Rossi, C. Cecchetto, M. Carlton) – 3:30
"Kiss" (Prince) – 3:39
"Sexy Girl" (M. Bonsanto, N. Hackett, R. Rossi) – 3:24
"Kiss Me" (M. Bonsanto, R. Rossi, T. Spencer, W. Biondi) – 4:08
"Lady Marmalade" (Bob Crewe, Kenny Nolan) – 4:07
"My Sharona" (Berton Averre) – 4:44
"Da Ya Think I'm Sexy" (C. Appice, R. Stewart) – 4:34

Personnel 
Sabrina Salerno – lead vocals and backing vocals
Malcolm Charlton – rap and backing vocals
Roberto Rossi – synthesizers, sequencer, drum machine and backing vocals
Claudio Bazzari – electric guitar on tracks 1–3, 5 & 6
Betty Vittori, Matteo Bonsanto – backing vocals

Charts

Certifications

References 

1987 debut albums
Sabrina Salerno albums